Lesbian, gay, bisexual, and transgender (LGBT) persons in Brunei face legal challenges not experienced by non-LGBT residents. Homosexuality is illegal in Brunei. Sexual relations between men are punishable by death or whipping; sex between women is punishable by caning or imprisonment. The sultanate applied a moratorium on the death penalty in 2019, which was still in effect ; the moratorium could be revoked at any time.

OutRight Action International has described Brunei as "the country that has the most worrisome state of rights for LGBT people in Southeast Asia". LGBT Bruneians feel the need to remain very discreet about their sexual orientation.

The Brunei Project, established in 2015, seeks to promote human rights, including religious freedom, free speech, and LGBT rights in Brunei through social media. The group organised a private community event in 2016, celebrating Brunei's first "International Day Against Homophobia" event.

Legality of same-sex sexual activity

Before the 2019 implementation of the  Penal Code Order (SPCO), homosexual acts were illegal and punishable by up to 10 years imprisonment, even if they were private and consensual. From 2014, Brunei began a staged implementation of Sharia law. Provisions of the SPCO dealing with adultery and sodomy, prescribing death by stoning and corporal punishments, were scheduled to come into force on 3 April 2019. 

Following widespread international condemnation and media attention, which included an open letter from American actor George Clooney calling for the boycott of the Sultan of Brunei's luxury hotels—The Beverly Hills Hotel and Hotel Bel-Air among them—the Brunei government extended its moratorium on the death penalty to encompass the SPCO in May 2019. Under the moratorium, the code's death by stoning penalty provisions are not enacted, for as long as the moratorium continues. The moratorium could be lifted at any time by the sultanate, allowing such death by stoning punishments to commence. As the sultan is an absolute monarch with full executive power, removing the moratorium and reinstating capital punishment would require minimal process and could occur without warning.  

When the move to Sharia law was announced, the United Nations urged Brunei to review its laws in this area, which has been described by media outlets as "medieval", "uncivilized" and "a return to the Stone Age". Their implementation was delayed until April 2019, after the Sultan declared that these laws should be regarded as "special guidance" from God. LGBT people, as well as the Christian and Buddhist minorities, have been advised by international human rights activists to remain discreet in the country. Anyone convicted of "tarnishing the image of Islam" may be heavily punished.

Under the SPCO, the de jure penalty for same-sex sexual relations between men is death by stoning, if married, provided they  admit to the acts or four male adult Muslim eyewitnesses testify to the acts. If the evidentiary standards are not met, the maximum penalty is seven years imprisonment and a whipping of thirty strokes. This is also the de facto penalty while the moratorium on the death penalty continues. For unmarried men, one year in prison or 100 lashes is the penalty. Sexual relations between women is punishable by a combination of any two of three stipulated penalties: a caning of forty lashes, a maximum prison term of 10 years, and a fine of up to B$40,000.

Gender identity and expression
Brunei does not allow changing one's name or gender on official documents. Sex reassignment surgery is not allowed.

On 11 March 2015, a civil servant was fined B$1,000 under the  Penal Code Order for cross-dressing.

Living conditions
The LGBT community in Brunei is very hidden and secret. Bruneian society tends to associate homosexuality with "effeminate men".

In 2011, academics at the University of Brunei made a formal study of gay people in Brunei. The study illustrated how they chose to remain silent and discreet about their sexual orientation. The researchers were only able to find 29 LGBT respondents, some of whom were foreigners. The country had a total population of 460,345 as of 2020.

2017 United States Department of State report
In 2017, the United States Department of State reported the following, concerning the status of LGBT rights in Brunei:

Summary table

See also

LGBT rights in Asia
Death penalty for homosexuality
Prince Azim of Brunei

References

External links 
 The Brunei Project

Human rights in Brunei
Brunei
LGBT in Brunei
Politics of Brunei